The Little Dumbbell Nebula, also known as Messier 76, NGC 650/651, the Barbell Nebula, or the Cork Nebula, is a planetary nebula in northern constellation Perseus. It was discovered by Pierre Méchain in 1780 and included in Charles Messier's catalog of comet-like objects as number 76. It was first recognised as a planetary nebula in 1918 by the astronomer Heber Doust Curtis. However, there is some contention to this claim, as Isaac Roberts in 1891 did suggest that M76 might be similar to the Ring Nebula (M57), being instead as seen from the side view. The structure is now classed as a bipolar planetary nebula (BPNe), denoting two stars which have burst, leaving neutron star or white dwarf remnants and luminous envelopes.
Distance to M76 is currently estimated as 780 parsecs or 2,500 light years, making the average dimensions about 0.378 pc. (1.23 ly.) across.

The total nebula shines at the apparent magnitude of +10.1 with its central star or planetary nebula nucleus (PNN) at +15.9v (16.1B) magnitude. The UV-light from the nucleus is growing a luminous nebula as its envelope, and has the surface temperature of about 88,400 K. Factoring in the solar system's movement and focussing on whether more approaching or parting, it is not receding, having radial velocity of −19.1 km/s.

The Little Dumbbell Nebula derives its common name from its resemblance to the Dumbbell Nebula (M27) in Vulpecula. It was originally thought to consist of two separate emission nebulae so bears New General Catalogue numbers NGC 650 and 651.

See also 
 Messier object
 List of Messier objects
 List of planetary nebulae

References

External links

 
 NightSkyInfo.com – M76, the Little Dumbbell Nebula
 Little Dumbbell Nebula (M76, NGC 650 and 651)
 The Little Dumbbell Nebula @ SEDS Messier pages
 

Messier objects
NGC objects
Perseus (constellation)
Planetary nebulae
Orion–Cygnus Arm
Astronomical objects discovered in 1780